Gondysia similis, the gordonia darkwing is a moth of the family Noctuidae. The species was first described by Achille Guenée in 1852. It is found in the US from North Carolina to Mississippi and Florida. The food plant occurs in Alabama and Mississippi and the moth could be expected from these areas as well.

The wingspan is about 37 mm. There are three or more generations in North Carolina with adults on wing from April to September.

The larvae feed on Gordonia lasianthus.

References

External links

"Neadysgonia similis". South Carolina Moths. Retrieved December 14, 2019.

Catocalinae
Moths described in 1852